Chuniella may refer to:
 Chuniella (worm), a genus of worms in the family Chuniellidae
 Chuniella (alga), a genus of algae in the class Bacillariophyceae, order and family unassigned